Erick Harding "Rick" Peterson (born October 30, 1954) is a former pitcher and pitching coach in Major League Baseball. He was most recently the director of pitching development for the Baltimore Orioles. He was a pitcher in the Pittsburgh Pirates organization, but is most notable as the pitching coach for the Oakland Athletics, New York Mets, and the Milwaukee Brewers. Peterson is known for his unique use of biomechanical research and psychological principles to help pitchers improve their pitching motions. His nicknames include "The Jacket" (because he always wears a jacket during games) and "The Professor." He is also known for placing his hand on the shoulder of the pitcher during mound visits.

Early life
Peterson was born in New Brunswick, New Jersey. He graduated from Mt. Lebanon High School in the Pittsburgh suburb of Mt. Lebanon, Pennsylvania. The Baltimore Orioles drafted him out of high school, but instead of signing with the Orioles, he chose to go to Gulf Coast Junior College in Panama City, Florida. He then attended Jacksonville University and graduated with a combined degree in psychology and art.

Playing career 
Peterson was drafted for the second time in the 21st round of the June 1976 free agent draft by the Pittsburgh Pirates. At that time, his father, Pete Peterson, was Pittsburgh's farm system director and future general manager. Rick Peterson played in class-A for the Pirates organization for four years, in 1976–79, and also made appearances at higher levels of the minors in 1982, 1983 and 1988.

Coaching career 
Peterson began his coaching career in Minor League Baseball when he coached with the single-A Salem Pirates (now Salem Avalanche) of the Carolina League from 1979 to 1980. In 1980, he was part of the coaching staff with the (R) Gulf Coast Pirates of the Gulf Coast League. From 1981 to 1982, Peterson was with the (AA) Buffalo Bisons of the Eastern League. After his stay in Buffalo, he got a coaching position with the (AA) Lynn Sailors of the Eastern League in 1983.

Pittsburgh Pirates

In 1984, Peterson became the bullpen coach of the Pittsburgh Pirates. Peterson held this coaching job with the Pirates from 1984 to 1985.

Cleveland Indians

His father was fired by the Pirates during the 1985 season, and Peterson left the Pittsburgh system after that season as well.  He joined the Cleveland Indians organization in 1986 and was a part of the coaching staff of Waterbury (AA) of the Eastern League in 1986, Buffalo (AAA) of the American Association in 1987 and Colorado Springs Sky Sox (AAA) of the Pacific Coast League in 1988.

Chicago White Sox
After departing the Cleveland organization, Peterson joined the Chicago White Sox farm system and spent six seasons there as a pitching coach. Peterson was with Birmingham Barons (AA) of the Southern League in 1989–91, Vancouver (AAA) of the American Association in 1992, and Nashville (AAA) of the Pacific Coast League in 1993–94. After spending many years in the minor leagues, Peterson was promoted to the White Sox on June 21, 1994.

From 1994 to 1995, Peterson stayed with the White Sox as a Co-director of the sports psychology program as it related to performance behavior.

Toronto Blue Jays

In 1996, Peterson became the Toronto Blue Jays minor league pitching coordinator. The following season, he was the pitching coach of the Trenton Thunder, then the AA affiliate of the Boston Red Sox.

Oakland Athletics

Peterson joined the Oakland Athletics organization as a roving minor league pitching instructor for the 1998 season. He was named the major league pitching coach for the A's on March 26, 1998. He is well known for helping the A's develop the ‘Big Three’ of Barry Zito, Mark Mulder, and Tim Hudson. All three pitchers became 20-game winners under Rick Peterson and Zito won the 2002 American League Cy Young Award. After he arrived in 1998, Peterson helped his pitching staff obtain an American League best ERA for two years, 3.58 in 2002 and 3.63 in 2003.

New York Mets
Peterson joined the New York Mets in November 2003 as their pitching coach, replacing Rick Waits. In July 2004, Peterson allegedly said he could "fix" Tampa Bay Devil Rays pitcher Víctor Zambrano in "10 minutes" and that Mets’ top prospect and former first-round draft pick Scott Kazmir was at least 3 years away from being a Major League pitcher. The Mets shortly traded Kazmir for Zambrano, which was poorly received by many Mets fans, and the negative response grew when Zambrano had dismal results with the Mets after the trade, while Kazmir was immediately promoted to the majors by the Devil Rays and had strong early success. Many believed that Peterson's statements indicated that he was a prime mover in making the trade. Others claim that Peterson was merely giving his opinion as pitching coach, and that any responsibility for the trade should fall on GM Jim Duquette, owner Fred Wilpon,  COO Jeff Wilpon, or scouting directors Al Goldis and Bill Livesey. Early in the 2006 season, Zambrano suffered a season-ending injury to his elbow, and he was not re-signed after the season; the following season (2007) would be his last in the Major Leagues. Kazmir, in contrast, became a three-time All-Star (2006, 2008, 2014) and led the American League in strikeouts in 2007.

Some Mets fans have also pointed out that Heath Bell floundered during Peterson's tenure as the Mets pitching coach yet thrived immediately after leaving the Mets, even becoming an All-Star with the San Diego Padres in 2009. "Everything in New York was so serious", Bell said. "I should keep my mouth shut, but I never do. In 2005, I didn't pitch for 28 straight days. I don't know if I did something to Willie [Randolph, then the manager of the Mets]. I didn't always get along with [then pitching coach] Rick Peterson.". Baseball Prospectus listed Bell as one of its "Five players to watch in 2005"—along with Justin Morneau, D'Angelo Jiménez, Dan Haren, and Josh Beckett. After a poor 2005 season, however, Bell's game appearances declined from 42 in 2005 to 22 in 2006 before he was traded.

On February 2, 2007, Peterson's contract with the Mets was extended through the 2009 season.

On June 17, 2008, Rick Peterson, along with Manager Willie Randolph and first base coach Tom Nieto, was fired from his position with the New York Mets.

Milwaukee Brewers

On October 19, 2009, Peterson agreed to become the Milwaukee Brewers new pitching coach. However, when new manager Ron Roenicke's  staff was announced on November 15, 2010, it was revealed that Peterson had been replaced by Rick Kranitz with a year remaining on his contract.

Baltimore Orioles

In January 2012, Peterson was hired as the Director of Pitching Development for the Baltimore Orioles, a position he held through the 2016 season.

Business
In January 2009, Peterson along with Jim Duquette and other business partners launched 3P Sports.  3P Sports combined Peterson's coaching philosophies for conditioning, pitching drills and sports psychology with biomechanical analysis data using the work done by Dr. James Andrew's American Sports Medicine Institute ASMI as the benchmark. The 3P Program claims to help pitchers of all ages achieve peak pitching performance while remaining healthy.  3P sells directly via its web site www.3PSports.com, or through a series of Channel Partners located throughout North America. Delivered over the web as a membership program with 24 × 7 availability, 3P pitchers get monthly updates designed for peak performance results.

References

External links 

Prospectus Q&A: Rick Peterson

1954 births
Living people
Bradenton Explorers players
Buffalo Bisons (minor league) players
Charleston Patriots players
Chicago White Sox coaches
Colorado Springs Sky Sox players
Gulf Coast Pirates players
Jacksonville University alumni
Lynn Sailors players
Major League Baseball pitching coaches
Milwaukee Brewers coaches
Minor league baseball coaches
Navegantes del Magallanes players
American expatriate baseball players in Venezuela
New York Mets coaches
Niagara Falls Pirates players
Oakland Athletics coaches
Sportspeople from Mt. Lebanon, Pennsylvania
Sportspeople from New Brunswick, New Jersey
Pittsburgh Pirates coaches
Salem Pirates players